, also known as Saiin-no Kōgō (西院皇后), was an empress consort (chūgū) of her cousin Emperor Go-Sanjō of Japan.  

She was the daughter of Emperor Go-Ichijō. She served as Saiin (priestess) from 1032 until 1036.  She married her cousin the future emperor in 1051. In 1068, her husband became emperor. She had no children. 

After the death of her husband, she became a Buddhist nun under the name Saiin-no Kōgō (西院皇后).

References

Japanese princesses
Japanese empresses
Japanese Buddhist nuns
11th-century Buddhist nuns
1029 births
1093 deaths

History articles needing translation from Japanese Wikipedia
Japanese priestesses
Daughters of emperors